Rajasthan Administrative Service, popularly known as RAS, is a state civil service of state Rajasthan along with Rajasthan Accounts Service, Rajasthan Police Service and  other services. The officers are included in the state cadre of civil service officers. RAS officers undergo two years training at HCM Rajasthan State Institute of Public Administration.Cadre controlling authority for this service is Department of Personnel, Government of Rajasthan. The head of this service is Chief Secretary. RAS Exam Controversy.

Posts
RAS officers start service as assistant collector and executive magistrate in training period. After training they usually serve as Sub-Divisional Magistrate for some years. After that they are posted as additional district collector and additional district magistrate or additional Divisional Commissioner till their induction in Indian Administrative Service by promotion. Beside these posts they also hold various other posts like Deputy Secretary to Rajasthan Government, Joint Secretary to Rajasthan Government, Deputy Inspector General Stamp and Registration, Special Assistant to State Minister, Commissioner to Municipal Corporation, Additional Chief Executive Officer to Zila Parishad, chief executive officer to Zila Parishad, District Supply Officer, Secretary to Urban Improvement Trust, Registrar to State University, District Excise Officer, Member of Board of Revenue, Deputy and additional Commissioner to Colonisation and many other posts to different departments.

Functions
level and district level while delivering various government services apart from conducting revenue administration maintenance of law and order. They work at grass-root level of administration for policy implementation and policy formulation. They also work in secretariat at different posts.

Promotion
Promotions in service :-

Junior Scale : 5400 Grade : 0 - 5 Years

Senior Scale : 6600 Grade : 6 - 10 Years

Selection Scale : 7600 Grade : 11 - 18 Years

Supertime Scale : 8700 Grade : 18 - 25 Years

Higher Supertime : 9500 Grade : 26th Year

The cadres usually start from a designation lower in rank than Indian Administrative Service (IAS) (one of the All India Services). However, promoted RAS officers gradually can take posts equivalent to IAS officers. Usually it takes 25–30 years of service for promotion in IAS. Promotee IAS officers usually reach up to post of Divisional Commissioner before retirement. Promoted IAS officers are allotted a year of selection or batch on the basis of equivalent service of RAS to IAS.

See also 
Indian Administrative Service
Rajasthan Police Service
Rajasthan Accounts Service
Rajasthan Public Service Commission
HCM Rajasthan State Institute of Public Administration

References
https://www.indiatvnews.com/news/india/ras-exam-result-controversy-rajasthan-education-minister-govind-dotasra-statement-latest-updates-722024

https://www.viraltrends.biz/post/rpsc-ras-ras-full-form-ras-syllabus-ras-form

External links
 RAS Association
 RPSC Website

Government of Rajasthan
State civil services of India
1950 establishments in Rajasthan